The Renault Sport Spider is a roadster produced by the French automaker Renault Sport (a subsidiary of Renault) between 1996 and 1999.

Project
The idea for the Renault Spider was formulated in the early 1990s: in the midst of a revival after a difficult second half of the 1980s, Renault wanted a car to promote it as a sporting brand (similar to the Renault 5 Turbo from a decade earlier). The Spider was intended to both serve as a racing car, in a one-make series organized by Renault, and as a road car. The first prototypes for Project W94, as it was known at the time, were completed in mid-1994 and a concept version was presented to the public at the Geneva Motor Show a year later. The car went on sale in early 1996, assembled at the Alpine factory in Dieppe. Left hand drive versions were first produced with an aeroscreen device the same as the race cars. In 1997, a version with a full glass windscreen and wiper was made available.

Approximately 1800 cars were produced through 1999. The UK market only imported the windscreen version and 100 right hand drive cars were produced. The naturally aspirated 2-litre F7R engine produces .

The Spider was the first ever road car badged as a Renault Sport and the Brand name has subsequently been used for all high performance Renault cars that are developed by the Renault Sport division which is a separate company with the Renault-Nissan Alliance.

Features
Designed from the outset as a driver's car, the chassis was made of aluminium for its combination of low weight and substantial strength, while the actual bodywork is a plastic composite. Unusually, the Spider did not have a roof, either folding or hard-top. The gearbox and the engine were one unit transversally fixed in an oscillating hinge (an arrangement inspired by aeronautical design), which all but eradicated the interference of engine vibration with the chassis, and the pedals of the Spider were adjustable as well as the seat so the driver could achieve a better driving position. Power for the Spider came from a version of the 2-litre F7R engine from the Clio Williams and Mégane Coupe, producing . Either a windscreen or a small wind deflector was fitted, with the driver wearing a helmet in vehicles without a windscreen.

Spider in motorsport

From the outset the Spider was intended to be the basis for a new one-car racing series. Renault had been running these championships since the early 80s with the 5 Turbo, 21 Turbo, and Clio models. A special Spider Trophy edition was designed and built for the purpose, with the engine tuned to produce . The Spider championships ran for several years as support series to larger championships such as the British Touring Car Championship (in which it is remembered for having produced one of that series' top drivers of recent years, Jason Plato, who won 11 out of 14 races in the inaugural year of the UK Spider Cup). In 1999 Andy Priaulx beat Plato's record of eight successive race wins in the Spiders by taking a clean sweep of 13 wins in all 13 races. He also qualified for each one on pole position and took fastest laps in all but two of the events.

Motorsport specification
 Power:	143.9 kW (210 bhp) @ 6000 rpm, torque	184.4 Nm (136.0 lb·ft) @ 4500 rpm
 Redline:	6800 rpm
 Weight:	
 Front brakes:	300 mm (11.8 in), front wheels 40.6 × 20.3 cm (16.0 × 8.0 in), tire size 205/50VR-16
 Rear brakes:	310 mm (12.2 in), rear wheels 40.6 × 22.9 cm (16.0 × 9.0 in), tire size 225/50VR-16
 Transmission:	6-speed Sadev sequential
 Top speed:	~, 0– ~5.8 seconds,  mile ~14.1 seconds

References

External links

Renault Sport Spider German Website—Offering photos and videos. International Spider Register
RenaultSportClub - Anything from R5 Alpine to R.S. Clio 220T Trophy

Rear mid-engine, rear-wheel-drive vehicles
Spider
Roadsters
Sports racing cars
Cars introduced in 1996